Bóly is a district in central-eastern part of Baranya County. Bóly is also the name of the town where the district seat is found. The district is located in the Southern Transdanubia Statistical Region.

Geography 
Bóly District borders with Pécsvárad District to the north, Mohács District to the east, Siklós District to the southwest, Pécs District to the northwest. The number of the inhabited places in Bóly District is 16.

Municipalities 
The district has 1 town and 15 villages.
(ordered by population, as of 1 January 2012)

The bolded municipality is city.

See also
List of cities and towns in Hungary

References

External links
 Postal codes of the Bóly District

Districts in Baranya County